Century Lotus Stadium is a multi-purpose stadium in Foshan, Guangdong, China. It is currently used mostly for football matches.  The stadium holds 36,686 people and was built in 2005.  It hosted a first round match between China and Myanmar during 2010 FIFA World Cup qualifying. This building has a design similar to the reconstructed Jawaharlal Nehru Stadium, Delhi built by the same designers.

Notable events
Eason Chan - DUO World Tour - 30 September 2012
Joker Xue - Skyscraper World Tour - 26 August 2018

See also 
New Plaza Stadium

References

External links
Information on the venue

Football venues in China
Multi-purpose stadiums in China
Buildings and structures completed in 2005
Sports venues completed in 2005
Buildings and structures in Foshan
Sports venues in Guangdong
Gerkan, Marg and Partners buildings
Water polo venues